Ancognatha is a genus of rhinoceros beetles in the family Scarabaeidae. There are more than 20 described species in Ancognatha.

Species
These 22 species belong to the genus Ancognatha:

 Ancognatha atacazo (Kirsch, 1885)
 Ancognatha aymara Mondaca, 2016
 Ancognatha castanea Erichson, 1847
 Ancognatha corcuerai Figueroa & Ratcliffe, 2016
 Ancognatha erythrodera (Blanchard, 1846)
 Ancognatha gracilis Endrödi, 1966
 Ancognatha horrida Endrödi, 1967
 Ancognatha humeralis (Burmeister, 1847)
 Ancognatha hyltonscottae Martinez, 1965
 Ancognatha jamesoni Murray, 1857
 Ancognatha lutea Erichson, 1847
 Ancognatha manca (LeConte, 1866)
 Ancognatha matilei Dechambre, 2000
 Ancognatha nigriventris Otoya, 1945
 Ancognatha quadripunctata Bates, 1888
 Ancognatha rugulosa Endrödi, 1966
 Ancognatha scarabaeoides Erichson, 1847
 Ancognatha sellata Arrow, 1911
 Ancognatha ustulata (Burmeister, 1847)
 Ancognatha veliae Pardo-Locarno, Gonzalez & Montoya-Lerma, 2006
 Ancognatha vexans Ratcliffe, 1992
 Ancognatha vulgaris Arrow, 1911

References

Further reading

External links

 

Dynastinae
Articles created by Qbugbot